Yüksel Şanlı (born November 14, 1973) is a former competitor in Freestyle Wrestling from Turkey. Şanlı was in the 1996 Olympic Games and the 2000 Olympic Games. He finished 15th in 1996 and 9th in 2000.

He also represented Turkey at the World Wrestling Championships in 1994, 1995, 1997 and 1999. He won a bronze medal in 1999.

References

External links 
 

1973 births
Living people
Olympic wrestlers of Turkey
Wrestlers at the 1996 Summer Olympics
Wrestlers at the 2000 Summer Olympics
Turkish male sport wrestlers
Mediterranean Games gold medalists for Turkey
Mediterranean Games medalists in wrestling
Competitors at the 2001 Mediterranean Games
World Wrestling Championships medalists
European champions for Turkey
European Wrestling Champions